Draconian is an adjective meaning "of great severity", that derives from Draco, an Athenian law scribe under whom small offenses had heavy punishments (Draconian laws).

Draconian may also refer to:
 Draconian (band), a death/doom metal band from Sweden
 Draconian (video game), a computer game released in 1984
 Draconian (Doctor Who), an extraterrestrial race from the Doctor Who television series 
 Draconian (Dragonlance), a fictional species in the Dragonlance setting
 Draconian, a race from Age of Wonders: Shadow Magic
 Draconian Empire, a Humanoid Race in the Buck Rogers in the 25th Century TV series
 The Draconian, school magazine of the Dragon School in Oxford, England

See also 
 The Draconian Rage, an audio drama
 Draco (disambiguation)
 Draconia (disambiguation)
 Draconic (disambiguation)